Klin Kasalong is a 2019 Thai television soap opera adapted from the eponymous novel written by Pisit Sreeprasert, a Chiang Mai University professor. The series premiered on June 10, 2019 and last aired on July 29, 2019 on Channel 3. It starred Urassaya Sperbund and James Ma.  
The series was notable for featuring extensive use of the Northern Thai language in dialogue, and featuring facets of Northern Thai culture, including attire and cultural landmarks like Wat Lok Molee in Chiang Mai. The series was broadcast on Channel 3, and became the channel's third highest rated drama in 2019, after Krong Kam and Thong Ek Mhorya Tha Chalong.

Cast

Main 
 Urassaya Sperbund (Yaya) as Kasalong / Songpeep / Dr. Pimpisa / Pimmada
 James Ma (James) as Dr. Thanakrit / Sup / Prasawin
Thagoon Karnthip (Pop) as Manfah / Dr. Pakpoom
Natanat Losuwan (Fai) as Mei / Wijitra / Mok

Supporting 
Montree Jenuksorn (Pu) as Sunthorn (Pimpisa's father) / Nai Kwaen Mang (Kasalong, Songpeep's father) 
Penpak Sirikul (Tai) as Pudkaew (Pimpisa's mother) / Thongbai (Kasalong, Songpeep's mother) 
Warit Tipgomut (Tah/Ta) as Noijan Wanawech / Ramet Wanaret 
Kulteera Yordchang (Unda) as Bua Kiang (young) 
Sirinuch Petchurai (Koi) as Ah-Ma Tee-Nee (Grandmother Mo Sap and Bua Kiang) 
Thodsapol Siriwiwat (Thod) as Ah-Kong Tian-Aee’ (Grandfather Mo Sap and Bua Kiang)
Witaya Jethapai (Thanom Samton) as Intha (Manfah's father)
Naruemon Phongsuphap (Koi/Koy) as Kam-Hom (Manfah's mother)
Aranya Prathumthong (Pui/Puy) as Bua-Tong (Wealthy Grocery)
Wilawan Thalou as Sang-La (Chinese dessert seller)
Sitang Punnapop (Pai) as Fong-Kam (Vegetable and herb seller)
Lerwith Sangsith (Aon) as Sang (Servant of Mr. Mang's house) / Bhikkhu Tian (Priest)  
Supunnikar Jumrernchai (Fai) as kedkaew (Saito-san's wife) / Stand-in Kasalong / Songpeep
Shogo Tanikawa (Sho) as Sai-To (Ketkeaw's husband)

Guest 
Pisamai Wilaisak (Mee) as Grandma Buakiang (Old Age) (Grandma Primpy, a former servant of the governor's house.) (Ep.1)
Suchao Pongwilai as Aui Kaew (Old Age) (grandson, grandfather, father, teacher Intha) (Ep.1,6,8,10,15)
Supranee Charoenphol as Panjit (Dr. Thanakrit's mother) (Ep.1,3,6,8,10,14,15)
Sommart Praihirun (Piak) as In-Tha (Sri Wan's father) (Ep.13,14,15)
Watcharachai Sundarasiri (Ant) as Kroo Dab (Ep.5,6)
Pongsanart Vinsiri (Too) as Wongsingkam Wanawech (Little Chan's father/Rames' grandfather) (Ep.6,7,10,11,13)
Peter Tuinstra (Peter) as Dr.Naekercard (Doctor McCormick Hospital Chiang Mai) (Ep.2,10,11,12)
Chattarika Sittiprom (Care) as Sudawadee (Daughter of the Ministry of Education) (Ep.13)
Ken Streutker (Ken) as Dr.Kort (Doctor McCormick Hospital Chiang Mai) (Ep.3,5,6,10,11,12)
 as Aui Kaew (young) (Ep.13,14,15) 
Linpita Jindapoo (Ying) as Sri Wan (Aui Kaew's mother) (Ep.13,14,15)

Soundtracks

References

External links

See also 
 Rak Nakara

Thai historical television series
Thai television soap operas
2019 Thai television series debuts
2019 Thai television series endings
Channel 3 (Thailand) original programming
2010s Thai television series